Zombie virus may refer to:
Zombie (computing), a computer connected to the Internet that has been compromised by a hacker, computer virus or trojan horse program
Zombie apocalypse, a literary genre